Rock Follies is a soundtrack album of the 1976 UK television series Rock Follies. The album featured songs from the show, sung by stars Julie Covington, Charlotte Cornwell and Rula Lenska. The songs were composed by Howard Schuman and Roxy Music's Andy Mackay. The album reached No.1 in the UK album charts.

Overview 
The series Rock Follies was a musical drama, which centered on a singing trio and their struggles to become famous. Throughout the series, the fictional band (The Little Ladies) performed a number of songs - all original compositions. During the success of the series, an album containing 12 of the tracks was released by Island Records in the UK, and Atlantic Records in the US. It exceeded expectations by entering the charts at No.1, which was very much a rarity at the time. It remained at the top for three weeks in April 1976. Two singles were taken from the album; "Glen Miller is Missing" backed with "Talking Pictures", and "Sugar Mountain" backed with the non-album "War Brides", although neither of these charted.

The music was written by Andy Mackay, who was a founding member of Roxy Music, while the lyrics were written by Howard Schuman (who also wrote the television screenplay).

Rock Follies was re-released on Compact disc in 2000 by Virgin Records.

Track listing
All tracks credited to Howard Schuman and Andy Mackay

Side One
 "Sugar Mountain" — 2:47
 "Good Behaviour" — 2:35
 "Stairway" — 4:05
 "Daddy" — 2:00
 "Lamplight" — 3:55
 "The Road" — 3:55
Side Two
 "Glenn Miller is Missing" — 3:12
 "Biba Nova" — 3:55
 "Talking Pictures" — 2:53
 "Hot Neon" — 3:02
 "Roller Coaster" — 1:25
 "Rock Follies" — 3:58
CD Bonus track:
 "War Brides"  - 2:47

Personnel
 Julie Covington - lead vocals
 Charlotte Cornwell - vocals
 Rula Lenska - vocals
Ray Russell - guitar
Brian Chatton - keyboards
Peter Van Hooke - percussion
Tony Stevens - bass
Ray Russell - string arrangements
Robin Williams - Violin solo
Sadie McKenzie - Backing vocals
Andy Mackay - saxophone

Charts

Weekly charts

Year-end charts

Certifications and sales

References 

1976 soundtrack albums
Television soundtracks
Island Records soundtracks